Darius Ciraco (born February 13, 1996) is a professional Canadian football offensive lineman for the Toronto Argonauts of the Canadian Football League (CFL).

University career
Ciraco played U Sports football for the Calgary Dinos from 2014 to 2017.

Professional career

Hamilton Tiger-Cats
Ciraco was drafted sixth overall by the Hamilton Tiger-Cats in the 2018 CFL Draft and signed with the team on May 22, 2018. He started all 18 regular season games and both playoff games in his first season and was named the Tiger-Cats' Most Outstanding Rookie. Ciraco re-signed with the Hamilton Tiger-Cats on January 15, 2021. He became a free agent upon the expiry of his contract on February 8, 2022.

Ottawa Redblacks
On February 8, 2022, it was announced that Ciraco had signed with the Ottawa Redblacks. He played in 16 regular season games in 2022 and became a free agent on February 14, 2023.

Toronto Argonauts
On February 14, 2023, it was announced that Ciraco had signed with the Toronto Argonauts.

References

External links
Toronto Argonauts bio

1996 births
Living people
Players of Canadian football from Ontario
Sportspeople from Burlington, Ontario
Canadian football offensive linemen
Hamilton Tiger-Cats players
Calgary Dinos football players
Ottawa Redblacks players
Toronto Argonauts players